The Manchester Ship Canal Pilots' Association was a trade union in the United Kingdom. It merged with the Transport and General Workers' Union in 1943.

See also
 List of trade unions
 Transport and General Workers' Union
 TGWU amalgamations

References
Arthur Ivor Marsh, Victoria Ryan. Historical Directory of Trade Unions, Volume 5 Ashgate Publishing, Ltd., Jan 1, 2006 pg. 436

Defunct trade unions of the United Kingdom
Maritime pilots' trade unions
Trade unions disestablished in 1943
Transport and General Workers' Union amalgamations
Trade unions based in Greater Manchester